Scottish Academic Press is an old Scottish publishing company. It is based in Edinburgh on Brandfield Street.

References

External links
 Description of SAP

Companies based in Edinburgh
Book publishing companies of Scotland